Well Station Drive is a light rail station on the Canberra Metro R1 Civic to Gungahlin line, located at the intersection of Well Station Drive and Flemington Road. It serves the residential suburb of Harrison and is the closest station to many businesses in Mitchell. The station's location and lack of suitable footpaths makes access to the industrial area difficult for pedestrians, leading to safety concerns within the community. Bicycle racks and "kiss and ride" bays are currently installed around the intersection adjacent to the station.

In June 2019, the ACT Government announced funding for the construction of a 200 space park and ride to be built adjacent to the station, as well as an addition stop between Well Station Drive and EPIC to better serve the Mitchell industrial area.

Light rail services 
All services in both directions stop at the station. Prior to the opening of the Sandford Street stop, some peak hour services originating at Gungahlin Place terminated here when returning to the depot. Although the station is not a major interchange, transfer to local ACTION bus route 18 is also available.

References

Light rail stations in Canberra
Railway stations in Australia opened in 2019